Twang!: A Tribute to Hank Marvin & The Shadows  is a tribute CD released in 1996 on Pangǽa Records.  The collection features mostly guitar players performing songs popularised by The Shadows, which featured their lead guitar player Hank Marvin. The Shadows were largely a British phenomenon, so most of the artists on the collections are British or from Commonwealth countries.

The liner notes were written by Pete Townshend.  The album concept was by Miles Copeland.

Tracks
 Apache by Ritchie Blackmore
 FBI by Brian May
 Wonderful Land by Tony Iommi
 The Savage by Steve Stevens
 The Rise and Fall of Flingel Bunt by Hank Marvin
 Midnight by Peter Green and the Splinter Group
 Spring is Nearly Here by Neil Young and Randy Bachman
 Atlantis by Mark Knopfler
 The Frightened City (theme from the film The Frightened City) by Peter Frampton
 Dance On by Keith Urban
 Stingray by Andy Summers
 The Stranger by Bela Fleck and the Flecktones

References

Tribute albums